Tebbe's reagent is the organometallic compound with the formula (C5H5)2TiCH2ClAl(CH3)2. It is used in the methylenation of carbonyl compounds, that is it converts organic compounds containing the R2C=O group into the related R2C=CH2 derivative. It is a red solid that is pyrophoric in the air, and thus is typically handled with air-free techniques. It was originally synthesized by Fred Tebbe at DuPont Central Research.

Tebbe's reagent contains two tetrahedral metal centers linked by a pair of bridging ligands. The titanium has two cyclopentadienyl (or  Cp) rings and aluminium has two methyl groups. The titanium and aluminium atoms are linked together by both a methylene bridge (-CH2-) and a chloride atom in a nearly square-planar (Ti–CH2–Al–Cl) geometry.  The Tebbe reagent was the first reported compound where a methylene bridge connects a transition metal (Ti) and a main group metal (Al).

Preparation
The Tebbe reagent is synthesized from titanocene dichloride and trimethylaluminium in toluene solution.

Cp2TiCl2 + 2 Al(CH3)3 → CH4 + Cp2TiCH2AlCl(CH3)2 + Al(CH3)2Cl

After about 3 days, the product is obtained after recrystallization to remove Al(CH3)2Cl.  Although syntheses using the isolated Tebbe reagent give a cleaner product, successful procedures using the reagent "in situ" have been reported. Instead of isolating the Tebbe reagent, the solution is merely cooled in an ice bath or dry ice bath before adding the starting material.

An alternative but less convenient synthesis entails the use of dimethyltitanocene (Petasis reagent):

Cp2Ti(CH3)2 + Al(CH3)2Cl → Cp2TiCH2AlCl(CH3)2 + CH4
One drawback to this method, aside from requiring Cp2Ti(CH3)2, is the difficulty of separating product from unreacted starting reagent.

Reaction mechanism
Tebbe's reagent itself does not react with carbonyl compounds, but must first be treated with a mild Lewis base, such as pyridine, which generates the active Schrock carbene.

Also analogous to the Wittig reagent, the reactivity appears to be driven by the high oxophilicity of Ti(IV). The Schrock carbene (1) reacts with carbonyl compounds (2) to give a postulated oxatitanacyclobutane intermediate (3).  This cyclic intermediate has never been directly isolated, presumably because it breaks down immediately to the produce the desired alkene (5).

Scope
The Tebbe reagent is used in organic synthesis for carbonyl methylenation.
  This conversion can also be effected using the Wittig reaction, although the Tebbe reagent is more efficient especially for sterically encumbered carbonyls.  Furthermore, the Tebbe reagent is less basic than the Wittig reagent and does not give the β-elimination products.

Methylenation reactions also occur for aldehydes as well as esters, lactones and amides.  The Tebbe reagent converts esters and lactones to enol ethers and amides to enamines.  In compounds containing both ketone and ester groups, the ketone selectively reacts in the presence of one equivalent of the Tebbe reagent.

The Tebbe reagent methylenates carbonyls without racemizing a chiral α carbon.  For this reason, the Tebbe reagent has found applications in reactions of sugars where maintenance of stereochemistry can be critical.

The Tebbe reagent reacts with acid chlorides to form titanium enolates by replacing Cl−.

Modifications
It is possible to modify Tebbe's reagent through the use of different ligands. This can alter the reactivity of the complex, allowing for a broader range of reactions. For example, cyclopropanation can be achieved using a chlorinated analogue.

See also

Related organotitanium reagents and reactions
Kulinkovich reaction
Petasis reagent
Lombardo reagent
McMurry reaction

Related methylenation reactions
Nysted reagent
Peterson olefination
Wittig reaction
Kauffmann olefination

References

Reagents for organic chemistry
Titanocenes
Organoaluminium compounds
Chloro complexes
Titanium(IV) compounds